George Gauld may refer to:

 George Gauld (aviator) (died 1964), Canadian World War I flying ace
 George Gauld (surveyor) (1731–1782), British military engineer, cartographer and surveyor
 George Gauld (cricketer) (1873–1950), English cricketer